Epsom was a rural district of Surrey from 1894 to 1933.

It was created in 1894 and covered the area of the formed Epsom Rural Sanitary District – i.e. the parishes of Ashtead, Banstead, Cheam, Chessington, Cobham, Cuddington, Ewell, Fetcham, Great Bookham, Headley, Little Bookham and Stoke d'Abernon.  The parish of Woodmansterne was added from the disbanded Croydon Rural District in 1915, whilst Cheam became part of the Sutton and Cheam urban district in 1918.

The rural district was abolished in 1933, under the Local Government Act 1929.  It was split between the urban districts of Banstead, Carshalton, Dorking, Epsom and Ewell, Esher, Leatherhead, Surbiton and Sutton and Cheam, and Dorking and Horley Rural District.

References
A Vision of Britain Through Time: Epsom

Districts of England created by the Local Government Act 1894
History of Surrey
Rural districts of England